Matthew 1 is the first chapter of the Gospel of Matthew in the New Testament. It contains two distinct sections. The first lists the genealogy of Jesus from Abraham to his legal father Joseph, husband of Mary, his mother. The second part, beginning at verse 18, provides an account of the virgin birth of Jesus Christ.

Text

The original text was written in Koine Greek. This chapter is divided into 25 verses.

Textual witnesses

Some early manuscripts containing the text of this chapter are:
 in Koine Greek
Codex Vaticanus (~325–350; complete)
Codex Sinaiticus (~330–360; complete)
Codex Washingtonianus (~400)
Codex Bezae (~400; extant verses 21–34)
Codex Ephraemi Rescriptus (~450; extant verses 3-34)
 in Syriac
Curetonian Gospels (2nd/5th century)
Syriac Sinaiticus (4th/5th century)
Peshitta (5th century)

The genealogy

Matthew 1:1-17

Matthew opens with the genealogy of Jesus, set out in three stages each of 14 generations: from Abraham to David, from David to the Babylonian exile and thence to Jesus' legal father Joseph, the husband of Mary his mother. The list opens and closes with a significant title for Jesus as "Jesus Christ" (1:1, 1:18; rarely used in the Gospel of Matthew). The opening words of the gospel show that it is written by a Jew for Jewish readers. The genealogy demonstrates that Jesus comes from the seed of Abraham and belongs to the House of David, and thus is their heir. The Gospel also asserts Jesus is, in fact, the Son of God, and Joseph is, thus, not actually Jesus' father. Legally, however, Joseph is Jesus' father and some scholars contend legal parentage is of the most importance. Ra McLaughlin argues that the central event in this passage is actually the adoption of Jesus by Joseph (signified by his naming of the child), which alone makes Jesus eligible to be the messiah from the line of David.

The section begins with Abraham, who is traditionally regarded as the ancestor of all the families of the Earth. It then runs through the prominent Old Testament figures of Isaac, Jacob, and Judah. The passage also references Judah's brothers who have no actual place in the genealogy. Gundry contends they are included because the author of Matthew is trying to portray the people of God as a brotherhood.

There are several problems with the genealogies. The list here is significantly different from that found in Luke 3, where the list from the Babylonian captivity to Jesus' grandfather is wholly different. Matthew skips several names in portions where the genealogy is well known from other sources, Jehoiakim is left out in 1:11 and four names are dropped from 1:8. Unlike most Biblical genealogies, Matthew's genealogy mentions several figures not in the direct line of descent, including four women, Tamar, Rahab, Ruth and Bathsheba.

Several theories address these questions. One popular theory is that, while Matthew provides the genealogy of Joseph and his father Jacob, Luke details the genealogy of Joseph's father-in-law Heli. Thus, Matthew focuses on Jesus' royalty lineage, rather than precise biological line (that possibly used by Luke) which he did not have access to. McLaughlin argues that because Jeconiah must be counted in two different groups in order to make the "fourteen generations" of 1:17, the genealogy here must be seen, not as a historically complete list, but as a literary device intended to highlight four significant events in Israelite history: the covenant with Abraham, the covenant with David, the Babylonian exile, and especially the reign of the messiah, which is the subject of the rest of the Gospel.

Other scholars doubt these theories, and most who do not believe in the inerrancy of the Bible believe one or both of the pair are historically inaccurate. Luke's genealogy contains a more realistic number of names, given the time period, and Matthew's list also lacks the papponymic naming used in the period. Gundry believes the latter part of Matthew's list is "a large figure of speech". He argues that at the time it was perfectly acceptable to fill gaps in a historical narrative with plausible fiction.

Birth of Jesus

Matthew 1:18-25

The second part of Matthew 1 relates some of the events leading up to the birth of Jesus (Matthew 2:1). While Luke and Matthew focus on varying details, the most important ideas, such as the Virgin Birth and the divine nature of Jesus, are shared. Unlike Luke's account, Matthew focuses on the character of Joseph and Joseph's discovery and concern over his betrothed's pregnancy "before they came together", and the message from an angel telling Joseph to stand by Mary, quoting Isaiah 7:14 presaging the birth of the Messiah.

This section's focus on Joseph is unusual. Swiss theologian Eduard Schweizer suggests that Matthew is far more concerned with proving Jesus' legal status as the stepson of Joseph, and thus a legal heir of David, than with proving the Virgin Birth. Schweizer feels this evinces Matthew's intended audience was of predominantly Jewish background, a pattern continuing throughout the Gospel, and the importance Old Testament references provides further evidence. Commentary writer David Hill believes that the quote from Isaiah was, in fact, the central element and believes the entire last part of the chapter was written to prove that Jesus' story matches the prophecy.

Stendhal, by contrast, sees the second section of this chapter as a large footnote to the last line of the genealogy, a lengthy explanation of why Joseph is merely the husband of Jesus' mother but also why Jesus is an heir to David. McLaughlin argues that Matthew recognizes that the prophecy Isaiah gave to King Ahaz in the referenced Old Testament passage concerned a virgin living at that time (namely, Isaiah's wife) and a child (namely, Maher-Shalal-Hash-Baz), who was born as a sign to Ahaz (Isaiah 8:1), and he argues that Matthew saw the act of salvation of which Maher-Shalal-Hash-Baz's birth was a sign as a "type" (or pre-figuring) of the salvation that would come through the virgin and child he was describing (namely, Mary and Jesus).

Other commentators feel this section should be attached to the second chapter, which is divided into four sections, each focusing on an Old Testament passage, and this portion is often seen as the first of those sections.

Verses

Full text
In the King James Version this chapter reads:

 The book of the generation of Jesus Christ, the son of David, the son of Abraham.
 Abraham begat Isaac; and Isaac begat Jacob; and Jacob begat Judas and his brethren;
 And Judas begat Phares and Zara of Thamar; and Phares begat Esrom; and Esrom begat Aram;
 And Aram begat Aminadab; and Aminadab begat Naasson; and Naasson begat Salmon;
 And Salmon begat Booz of Rachab; and Booz begat Obed of Ruth; and Obed begat Jesse;
 And Jesse begat David the king; and David the king begat Solomon of her that had been the wife of Urias;
 And Solomon begat Roboam; and Roboam begat Abia; and Abia begat Asa;
 And Asa begat Josaphat; and Josaphat begat Joram; and Joram begat Ozias;
 And Ozias begat Joatham; and Joatham begat Achaz; and Achaz begat Ezekias;
 And Ezekias begat Manasses; and Manasses begat Amon; and Amon begat Josias;
 And Josias begat Jechonias and his brethren, about the time they were carried away to Babylon:
 And after they were brought to Babylon, Jechonias begat Salathiel; and Salathiel begat Zorobabel;
 And Zorobabel begat Abiud; and Abiud begat Eliakim; and Eliakim begat Azor;
 And Azor begat Sadoc; and Sadoc begat Achim; and Achim begat Eliud;
 And Eliud begat Eleazar; and Eleazar begat Matthan; and Matthan begat Jacob;
 And Jacob begat Joseph the husband of Mary, of whom was born Jesus, who is called Christ.
 So all the generations from Abraham to David are fourteen generations; and from David until the carrying away into Babylon are fourteen generations; and from the carrying away into Babylon unto Christ are fourteen generations.
 Now the birth of Jesus Christ was on this wise: When as his mother Mary was espoused to Joseph, before they came together, she was found with child of the Holy Ghost.
 Then Joseph her husband, being a just man, and not willing to make her a public example, was minded to put her away privily.
 But while he thought on these things, behold, the angel of the LORD appeared unto him in a dream, saying, Joseph, thou son of David, fear not to take unto thee Mary thy wife: for that which is conceived in her is of the Holy Ghost.
 And she shall bring forth a son, and thou shalt call his name JESUS: for he shall save his people from their sins.
 Now all this was done, that it might be fulfilled which was spoken of the Lord by the prophet, saying,
 Behold, a virgin shall be with child, and shall bring forth a son, and they shall call his name Emmanuel, which being interpreted is, God with us.
 Then Joseph being raised from sleep did as the angel of the Lord had bidden him, and took unto him his wife:
 And knew her not till she had brought forth her firstborn son: and he called his name JESUS.

Notes

References

Sources
Albright, W.F. and C.S. Mann. "Matthew." The Anchor Bible Series. New York: Doubleday & Company, 1971.
Brown, Raymond E. The Birth of the Messiah: A Commentary on the Infancy Narratives in Matthew and Luke. London: G. Chapman, 1977.

Hill, David. The Gospel of Matthew. Grand Rapids: Eerdmans, 1981
Jones, Alexander. The Gospel According to St. Matthew. London: Geoffrey Chapman, 1965.

McLaughlin, Ra. "The Adoption of Jesus: On Matthew 1:1-25". Reformed Perspectives Magazine, vol. 7, no. 35. 2005.
Schweizer, Eduard. The Good News According to Matthew. Atlanta: John Knox Press, 1975

External links

 King James Bible - Wikisource
English Translation with Parallel Latin Vulgate
Online Bible at GospelHall.org (ESV, KJV, Darby, American Standard Version, Bible in Basic English)
Multiple bible versions at Bible Gateway (NKJV, NIV, NRSV etc.)

 
Matthew 01
Nativity of Jesus in the New Testament
Virgin birth of Jesus